The hourglass dolphin (Lagenorhynchus cruciger) is a small dolphin in the family Delphinidae that inhabits offshore Antarctic and sub-Antarctic waters. It is commonly seen from ships crossing the Drake Passage, but has a circumpolar distribution.

The species was identified as a new species by Jean René Constant Quoy and Joseph Paul Gaimard in 1824 from a drawing made in the South Pacific in 1820. It is the only cetacean to have been widely accepted as a species solely on witness accounts.

Description

The hourglass dolphin is colored black on top and white on the belly, with white patches on the sides and sometimes variations of dark grey. For this reason, it was colloquially known by whalers as a "sea cow" (although it does not belong to the taxonomic order Sirenia) or "sea skunk". Each flank has a white patch at the front, above the beak, eye and flipper, and a second patch at the rear. These two patches are connected by a thin white strip, creating, loosely speaking, an hourglass shape; hence the common name of the dolphin. The scientific name cruciger means "cross-carrier" and refers to the area of black coloration, which, viewed from above, vaguely resembles a Maltese cross or cross pattée. There have been no verified sightings of calves and their coloration remains unknown.

In its usual range the dolphin is easily identifiable. The southern right whale dolphin is the only cetacean of comparable size and comparable coloration with overlapping distributions that lives as far south. The absence of a dorsal fin in right whale dolphins, in contrast to the generally tall and curved dorsal fin of hourglass dolphins makes confusion of the two species very unlikely. The dorsal fin in hourglass dolphins is variable and the curvature may be particularly pronounced in older animals. The hourglass dolphin has disk-shaped vertebrae and other inclined processes which gives them higher stability.

Males are thought to be slightly smaller and lighter than females, although the small number of specimens does not permit a firm conclusion.

Like all species of dolphins, they use echolocation to find food.

Geographic range and distribution
The range is circumpolar from close to the Antarctic pack ice to about 45°S. The northernmost confirmed sightings are 36°S in the South Atlantic Ocean and 33°S near Valparaíso, Chile, in the Pacific. Sightings have been made most commonly from the south of New Zealand, around the South Shetland Islands and off Tierra del Fuego, Argentina.

Behavior
Hourglass dolphins are often seen in smaller groups up to 10–15 individuals, though groups of up to 100 have been observed.

They share feeding grounds with other cetaceans such as pilot whales, minke whales and southern right whale dolphins and are regularly seen with fin whales. Hourglass dolphins frequently bow-ride waves from ships and baleen whales.

Examinations of the stomach contents of the few specimens indicate they eat mantis shrimp, polychaete worms, and various (unrecorded) species of squid and small fish.

Taxonomy
The species was first named Delphinus cruciger by Quoy and Gaimard (1824) after their sighting in January 1820. Lesson and Garnot (1827) named another dolphin with two white patches on the sides Delphinus bivittatus. Throughout the 19th and early 20th centuries, scientists have given the hourglass dolphin various synonyms, including Phocoena crucigera (Philippi, 1893), Electra crucigera (Gray, 1871), and Lagenorhynchus clanculus (Gray, 1846; 1849; 1850; 1866). 
Though it is traditionally placed in the genus Lagenorhynchus, molecular analyses suggest the species is more closely related to the right whale dolphins and dolphins of the genus Cephalorhynchus and it has been suggested that it should be moved to a new genus Sagmatias. The taxonomic relationship with the genus Cephalorhynchus (which includes, among others, Hector's dolphin) is further supported by the similarity of the echolocation signals to the signals used by Cephalorhynchus-species.

Population status
Sighting surveys were conducted in 1976–77 and 1987–88. Abundance was estimated to be 144,300 individuals, based on line transect sightings in January 1977 and January 1988 in northern Antarctic waters. This is the only abundance estimate of hourglass dolphins to date.

Conservation status
The hourglass dolphin is covered by the Memorandum of Understanding for the Conservation of Cetaceans and Their Habitats in the Pacific Islands Region (Pacific Cetaceans MOU). They are also listed in Appendix II of the Convention on International Trade in Endangered Species (CITES). Although they have not been studied extensively, there are no known major threats to hourglass dolphins, and the species is listed as Least Concern on the IUCN Red List.

See also

List of cetaceans

References

External links
 
 Lagenorhynchus cruciger – Hourglass Dolphin, Species Profile and Threats Database, Australian Government Department of the Environment and Energy
 OBIS SEAMAP hourglass dolphin species profile, Duke University

Mammals of Argentina
Mammals of Chile
Mammals of Patagonia
Fauna of Antarctica
Cetaceans of the Southern Ocean
hourglass dolphin
Lagenorhynchus